The Ad-Libbers is a CBS comedy sketch game show that aired in 1951.  A summer replacement for Mama, five live shows were broadcast before the series ended.

Format
Home viewers were invited to send in story ideas.  The host would read the story outline to the performers, who would then attempt to ad-lib dialogue to fit the story.

Cast
The show was hosted by Peter Donald. Regulars included Jack Lemmon, Charles Mendick, Patricia Housley, Joe Silver, Earl Hammond and Cynthia Stone.

Background
The series was based on a similar program titled What Happens Now?  The program aired on local New York station WOR-TV in 1949 and was hosted by Nelson Olmsted.   Regulars on the 1949 program included Ross Martin, Carol Ohmart and Larry Blyden.

References

External links

1950s American comedy game shows
1951 American television series debuts
1951 American television series endings
Black-and-white American television shows
CBS original programming
English-language television shows
Improvisation